Roy Gardner (18 January 1914 – 2 April 2004) was an Australian cricketer. He played three first-class cricket matches for Victoria between 1935 and 1936.

See also
 List of Victoria first-class cricketers

References

External links
 

1914 births
2004 deaths
Australian cricketers
Victoria cricketers
Cricketers from Melbourne